AOR, Ltd. (Authority on Radio Communications, Ltd.) is a Japanese based manufacturer of radio equipment, including transceivers, scanners, antennas and frequency monitors.

Established in 1977 when two radio amateurs decided to go professional. Based in Tokyo, Japan, they also have offices in the United Kingdom and the United States, and manufacturing facilities in Japan and the United Kingdom.

External links

 Official Site
 AOR UK
 AOR rigs Complete list of AOR radios

Electronics companies of Japan
Amateur radio companies
Companies based in Tokyo
Electronics companies established in 1977
Japanese brands
Japanese companies established in 1977